Stars on Parade is a variety show on the now-defunct DuMont Television Network.

Broadcast history
Stars on Parade was aired Wednesdays at 10pm EST from November 4, 1953, to June 30, 1954. The host for the first two episodes was Don Russell, who was the host of DuMont's series Guide Right and the announcer for DuMont's The Morey Amsterdam Show. The host for the rest of the series was musician and bandleader Bobby Sherwood (1914-1981).

Episode status
One episode known to exist features singer Sarah Vaughan performing "My Funny Valentine" and "Linger Awhile". Two episodes are held in the J. Fred MacDonald collection at the Library of Congress.

See also
List of programs broadcast by the DuMont Television Network
List of surviving DuMont Television Network broadcasts
1953-54 United States network television schedule

References

Bibliography
David Weinstein, The Forgotten Network: DuMont and the Birth of American Television (Philadelphia: Temple University Press, 2004) 
Alex McNeil, Total Television, Fourth edition (New York: Penguin Books, 1980) 
Tim Brooks and Earle Marsh, The Complete Directory to Prime Time Network TV Shows, Third edition (New York: Ballantine Books, 1964)

External links
Stars on Parade at IMDB
DuMont historical website
Sarah Vaughan on Stars on Parade at YouTube

DuMont Television Network original programming
Black-and-white American television shows
1953 American television series debuts
1954 American television series endings
1950s American variety television series